Benjamin Maurice Webb (born 21 August 1981), better known by the ring name Trent Seven, is an English professional wrestler, wrestling promoter, and actor. He was signed to WWE on their NXT UK brand, where he is a former NXT UK Tag Team Champion. He and Tyler Bate formed the tag team Moustache Mountain, who also had won the Progress Tag Team Championship and the RPW Undisputed British Tag Team Championship in the UK, as well as the Chikara Campeonatos de Parejas in the United States. Seven, Bate, and Pete Dunne collectively form the team "British Strong Style". Seven has also competed as a singles competitor, being a one-time ICW World Heavyweight Champion.

Early life 
Benjamin Maurice Webb was born in Wolverhampton on 21 August 1981. He is of Irish descent; his grandfather, Daniel O'Hara (1923–2021), immigrated to Wolverhampton's Tettenhall area from Menlough. He aspired to be an actor until he watched WrestleMania, which made him want to become a wrestler. As a young boy, he and several of his friends would often wrestle each other in their back gardens. In 2008, he decided to train for a career in professional wrestling, and purchased his own wrestling ring to train himself.

Professional wrestling career

Early career (2010–2012) 
Webb made his debut at the relatively late age of 29 during an Alternative Wrestling World show in Birmingham in 2010 and adopted the ring name Trent Seven, a play on Severn Trent, the company that supplies water to his home region. In the subsequent years, he split his time between wrestling and a day job.

In 2011 and 2012, Seven traveled to the United States to wrestle for Combat Zone Wrestling (CZW), losing on both occasions. He also traveled to Japan in 2012, working three shows for Big Japan Pro Wrestling, including a show at Korakuen Hall.

Fight Club Pro (2010–2020) 
Despite being a "part timer", Seven was granted a match for the Ring of Honor World Championship during ROH's 2011 tour of the United Kingdom. Seven lost to defending champion Davey Richards on 15 July 2011 on a show promoted by Fight Club Pro (FCP). At some point in 2011, Seven became the first holder of the FCP Championship, holding it until 25 November where he lost the title to Eddie Edwards. In 2013, he won FCP's annual "Infinity Trophy Tournament" when he defeated Mark Haskins in the finals. During an FCP show on 5 February 2016, Trent Seven unsuccessfully challenged Trevor Lee for the TNA X-Division Championship. On 7 January 2017, Moustache Mountain (Seven and Tyler Bate) teamed up with Joel Allen to defeat #CCK (Chris Brookes and Kid Lykos) and Shay Purser. With the win, Allen became the title holder of the Attack! 24:7 Championship, only for Allen to lose it the same night.

Chikara (2015–2017) 
In early 2015, Seven, alongside Bate, debuted in the American promotion Chikara as part of their tour of the United Kingdom, defeating The Hunter Brothers in a dark match on 3 April and losing to the Devastation Corporation (Max Smashmaster and Blaster McMassive) in another dark match on 6 April. In their final dark match on the tour, Seven and Bate teamed with up with Clint Margera to take on Pete Dunne, Damian Dunne and Jimmy Havoc in a losing effort. Seven teamed with Bate and Dan Moloney at that year's King of Trios as Team Fight Club: Pro, making it to the semi-finals before being eliminated by the Bullet Club (AJ Styles, Matt Jackson and Nick Jackson). 

In 2016, Seven and Bate began competing more regularly in Chikara. On 21 August they defeated Los Ice Creams (Hijo Del Ice Cream and Ice Cream Jr.), N_R_G (Hype Rockwell and Race Jaxon) and The Devastation Corporation to win the Chikara Campeonatos de Parejas. However, they were stripped of the title during Chikara's secret season 16.

Seven returned to Chikara on 1 September 2017, when he, Tyler Bate, and Pete Dunne, billed collectively as "House Strong Style", entered the 2017 King of Trios, defeating House Whitewolf (A-Kid, Adam Chase and Zayas) in their first round match. Over the next two days, House Strong Style defeated House Throwbacks (Dasher Hatfield, Mark Angelosetti and Simon Grimm) in the quarterfinals, House Rot (Frightmare, Hallowicked and Kobald) via forfeit in the semifinals and House Sendai Girls (Cassandra Miyagi, Dash Chisako and Meiko Satomura) in the finals to win the 2017 King of Trios.

Insane Championship Wrestling (2015–2016) 
Trent made his debut for Insane Championship Wrestling in early 2015, facing Mikey Whiplash at the O2 Academy Birmingham. Throughout the rest of the year, Trent would be seen competing on ICW's tour shows around the UK, quickly becoming a fan favorite.

In 2016, after returning to enter the 5th Annual Square Go match, Trent challenged Big Damo for the ICW World Heavyweight Championship, before entering into a feud with Mikey Whiplash, eventually leading to a 6 man contest at Shug's Hoose Party 3, between Legion (Mikey Whiplash, Tommy End & Michael Dante) and Moustache Mountain & Lewis Girvan. After Trent picked up the win for his team, Whiplash, who had been campaigning to main event Fear & Loathing XI, stated that he believed Trent Seven was the rightful challenger to the World Heavyweight Championship. In the months that followed, Trent, backed heavily by the ICW fans, campaigned for ICW GM Red Lightning to grant him a shot at the championship. After being disregarded by Lightning, Trent forced the GM to give him a match against Wolfgang at Fear & Loathing XI, with the title on the line inside a Steel Cage.

At Fear & Loathing XI, at The SSE Hydro, in front of the largest independent UK wrestling crowd for over 30 years, Trent faced Wolfgang in a Steel Cage match for the ICW World Heavyweight Championship. However, after being overcome with rage, Trent punched Wolfgang with his own knuckleduster on top of the cage, causing Wolfgang to fall to the floor, inadvertently winning the match. After earning himself one more shot at the title by defeating Chris Renfrew, Trent once again faced Wolfgang, at the O2 Academy Newcastle, at the 6th Annual Square Go event, and succeeded in becoming ICW World Heavyweight Champion.

Trent would remain ICW World Heavyweight Champion for 2 months, defending the title against the likes of BT Gunn, Pete Dunne, Jack Jester & Jordan Devlin, before losing the title to Joe Coffey at Barramania III. After a few months away, Trent returned briefly at Shug's Hoose Party 4, facing BT Gunn, Wolfgang, & Pete Dunne in a 4 Way Match for the WWE United Kingdom Championship. This match marked the first time the title had been defended on UK soil, outside of a WWE ring.

Trent would not return to ICW until almost a year & a half later, at Fear & Loathing XI, where he, Pete Dunne & Tyler Bate lost to the team of Wolfgang, BT Gunn & Noam Dar.

Progress Wrestling (2016–2019) 

Seven debuted with Progress Wrestling at Chapter 28 alongside Tyler Bate, losing to Damian and Pete Dunne. Seven returned at Chapter 32, losing to Rampage Brown. At Chapter 33, Seven turned heel, attacking Tyler Bate and aligning himself with Pete Dunne to form British Strong Style. At Chapter 36, Seven and Dunne defeated The London Riots (James Davis and Rob Lynch) to win the Progress Tag Team Championship, and successfully defended it in a rematch at Chapter 39. By virtue of winning that match, both Seven and Dunne were entered into a seven-man elimination match for the vacant Progress World Championship, which was eventually won by Dunne after Tyler Bate returned and attacked Jimmy Havoc, thus turning heel and aligning himself with Seven and Dunne. On 16 December, Seven and Dunne were stripped of the Progress Tag Team Championship after Dunne attempted to give his half of the shield to Bate. Two weeks later at Chapter 41, Seven and Bate defeated The London Riots and The LDRS of the New School (Marty Scurll and Zack Sabre Jr.) in a three-way tag team match to win the vacant titles.

Seven entered the Super Strong Style 16 Tournament in 2017, losing to Matt Riddle in the first round. On night 2, Seven and Dunne defeated David Starr and Pastor William Eaver and on night 3 Seven beat Mark Haskins in a submission match. After successful defending the tag team championship against teams such as the South Pacific Power Trip (TK Cooper and Travis Banks), and the Hunter Brothers, Seven and Bate eventually lost the title at Chapter 50 to #CCK (Chris Brookes and Kid Lykos), before winning it back less than a month later at Chapter 51. On 10 September, Seven and Bate lost the title to #CCK in a ladder match.

At Chapter 64, Seven participated in the Thunderbastard match winning by Morgan Webster while Seven was eliminated by TK Cooper. At Chapter 66, Moustache Mountain were unable to win back the Progress Tag Team Championships against Grizzled Young Veterans.
At Chapter 76, Seven defeated Doug Williams to win the Progress Atlas Championship. On Chapter 78, Seven defeated Zack Gibson to retain the Progress Atlas Championship.

WWE (2016–2022) 

On 15 December 2016, it was revealed that Seven would be one of 16 men competing in a two night tournament to crown the first-ever WWE United Kingdom Champion on 14 and 15 January 2017. Prior to the tournament, Seven, along with Pete Dunne were mentioned among the favorites to win the tournament. In the first round, Seven defeated HC Dyer to advance to the quarter finals, where he was defeated by Wolfgang. Seven signed a contract with WWE, which allowed him to continue taking independent bookings with some restrictions. On 15 February, Seven made his debut in WWE's developmental territory NXT, unsuccessfully challenging Bate for the United Kingdom Championship.
On 11 November, Moustache Mountain defeated the team of Pete Dunne and Mark Andrews. On 6 December, Seven was defeated by Killian Dain in a #1 contender's qualifying match for the NXT Championship. On 18 June at United Kingdom Championship, Seven reformed British Strong Style with Bate and Dunne to defeat The Undisputed Era (Adam Cole, Kyle O'Reilly, and Roderick Strong) in a six-man tag team match on 18 June. The following night, Mustache Mountain defeated O'Reilly and Strong to win the NXT Tag Team Championship, but lost the titles back to them two days at the 21 June NXT tapings (aired on 11 July) after Bate threw in the towel due to Seven's injured knee being targeted. After Seven's match with Zack Gibson on the 14 November episode of NXT UK, Gallus (Joe Coffey, Mark Coffey, and Wolfgang) would beat up Seven.

On 9 December 2021 episode of NXT UK, Moustache Mountain defeated Pretty Deadly (Lewis Howley and Sam Stoker) to win the NXT UK Tag Team Championship. On 2 June 2022 episode of NXT UK, Moustache Mountain lost the title against Ashton Smith and Oliver Carter. On 16 June episode of NXT UK, Seven attacked Bate, thus turning heel for the first time in his WWE career and disbanding the Moustache Mountain.
On 18 August 2022, it was announced that Seven was released from his WWE contract.

All Elite Wrestling (2022) 
Trent made his All Elite Wrestling debut on the December 7th episode of AEW Rampage. He lost an AEW All-Atlantic Championship match to Orange Cassidy.

Acting career 
Seven, under his real name, appeared as Hengist in the 2017 film Transformers: The Last Knight.

Personal life 
Webb continues to reside in Wolverhampton. Like his British Strong Style teammates Pete Dunne and Tyler Bate, he became a vegan after watching the 2014 documentary Cowspiracy.

Filmography

Television

Championships and accomplishments 

Attack! Pro Wrestling
Attack! 24:7 Championship (1 time)
Attack! Tag Team Championship (1 time) – with Tyler Bate
Chikara
Chikara Campeonatos de Parejas (1 time) – with Tyler Bate
King of Trios (2017) – with Pete Dunne and Tyler Bate
Fight Club: Pro
FCP Championship (1 time)
FCP Tag Team Championship (1 time) – with Tyler Bate
Infinity Trophy (2013)
Insane Championship Wrestling
ICW World Heavyweight Championship (1 time)
International Wrestling Syndicate
IWS World Tag Team Championship (1 time) – with Tyler Bate
Over the Top Wrestling
OTT Tag Team Championship (1 time) - with Tyler Bate 
OTT No Limits Championship (1 time,current)
Pro Wrestling Illustrated
 Ranked No. 111 of the top 500 singles wrestlers in the PWI 500 in 2019
Progress Wrestling
Progress Tag Team Championship (3 times) – with Pete Dunne (1) and Tyler Bate (2)
Progress Atlas Championship (1 time)
Revolution Pro Wrestling
RPW Undisputed British Tag Team Championship (1 time) – with Tyler Bate
Wrestling GO!
Wrestling GO! 24/7 Watermelon Championship (2 times)
WWE
NXT UK Tag Team Championship (1 time) - with Tyler Bate
NXT Tag Team Championship (1 time) - with Tyler Bate
NXT Tag Team Championship Invitational (2018) – with Tyler Bate

Notes

References

External links 
 
 
 
 

1981 births
Living people
English male professional wrestlers
Sportspeople from Wolverhampton
Professional wrestling trainers
NXT Tag Team Champions
NXT UK Tag Team Champions
Progress Wrestling Atlas Champions
PROGRESS Tag Team Champions
Undisputed British Tag Team Champions